Mónica Trueba Guillén (known as Francesca Guillén; born June 14, 1977) is a Mexican film, theater, and television actress.

Biography
Guillén was born in Mexico City on June 14, 1977, the daughter of actor Alejandro Camacho and actress Bárbara Guillén. Her acting career began in 1982, at age 5, on the television program Juguemos a cantar.

In 2000, she appeared in the feature film Such Is Life, directed by Arturo Ripstein and based on Seneca's Medea. This was shown at international festivals such as San Sebastian, Cannes, and Havana.

In 2007, she traveled with Ofelia Medina's troupe, taking Cada quien su Frida to stages in Spain, the United States, Cuba, and Denmark. She remained in the latter for a time, studying at the Odin Teatret under the direction of Eugenio Barba, with whom she collaborated during 2008 and 2009 on the productions The Medea Marriage and Ur-Hamlet.

In 2011, she received an award for Female Revelation from the Theatrical Journalism Association (APT) for her performance in the Jaime Chabaud play Lluna. She also participated in the play El Placer de Nuestra Lengua, which premiered in 2010.

Her first appearance in an American production took place in 2005 under the direction of independent filmmaker Zev Berman, in the thriller Borderland. During 2014 she joined the show Infieles. She also participated in the children's play El Cajón de los Secretos, and during 2013 she was part of the casts of La Hora by Luis Koellar for Micro Teatro and Juegos Profanos with a season on Radio UNAM, directed by Eduardo Ruiz Saviñón.

During 2012 she starred in the play Alicia subterránea, also directed by Eduardo Ruiz Saviñon. She premiered Mujer lagartija by Cutberto López, starring alongside , under the direction of Aarón Hernández Farfán as part of the Perpetual Voices cycle at the Shakespeare Forum. She also joined the cast of the show Negro Animal Tristeza, directed by Rodrigo Johnson.

She participated in the INBAL reading promotion programs Leo... luego existo and ¿Quieres que te lo lea otra vez?

During January 2015 she appeared in A Doll's House under the direction of Rodrigo Johnson.

Francesca Guillén has had an extensive career that includes appearances in short films, feature films, telenovelas, dance productions, narrative, and theater. She has integrated acrobatics and martial arts as well as other disciplines into her physical training.

Filmography

Telenovelas

References

External links
 

1977 births
Actresses from Mexico City
Living people
Mexican film actresses
Mexican stage actresses
Mexican telenovela actresses